In the theory of partial differential equations, a partial differential operator  defined on an open subset  

 

If this assertion holds with  replaced by real-analytic, then  is said to be analytically hypoelliptic. 

Every elliptic operator with  coefficients is hypoelliptic. In particular, the Laplacian is an example of a hypoelliptic operator (the Laplacian is also analytically hypoelliptic). In addition, the operator for the heat equation 
 
(where ) is hypoelliptic but not elliptic. However, the operator for the wave equation 
 
(where ) is not hypoelliptic.

References

Partial differential equations
Differential operators